Savigny-en-Terre-Plaine is a commune in the Yonne department in Bourgogne-Franche-Comté in north-central France.

Demography

See also
Communes of the Yonne department

References

Communes of Yonne